Rai'Shaun Williams, professionally known as Section 8, is an American record producer and songwriter currently signed with Warner Chappell Music. He is known for his frequent collaborations with rapper Lil Baby, having written and produced most notably "We Paid" and "The Bigger Picture", which reached number 10 and number 3 on the Billboard Hot 100 respectively in his triple platinum album My Turn. The latter song received two nominations at the 63rd Annual Grammy Awards for Best Rap Performance and Best Rap Song. Following its release in June 2020, he debuted at number 3 on Billboards Hot 100 Songwriters and Hot 100 Producers. He also produced Lil Baby's single "Errbody" which peaked at number 41 on the Billboard Hot 100. XXL listed Section 8 as one of the best hip hop producers of 2020, and one of 18 hip hop producers to look out for in 2021.

Career
In August 2020, Section 8 was signed to an exclusive deal with Warner Chappell Music, who cited him as one of the "best young producers in the game".

Production discography

References

Living people
African-American record producers
American hip hop record producers
Year of birth missing (living people)
21st-century African-American people